Benedicto “Bong” Ducat (born May 6, 1957) is a Filipino impressionist painter. He is now teaching at the University of Santo Tomas College of Fine Arts and Design. He is noted for his renderings of plants, flowers and nature in droplet-like brush strokes and bright colors. In college, Ducat won the University of Santo Tomas Benavides Civic Award.

Early life
Benedicto Ducat was born in Tondo, Manila on May 6, 1957. Bong is the son of Emerenciana and Abraham. He attended Melchora Aquino Elementary School and Jose P. Laurel High School.
During his school days, he participated in art contests. He won 1st prize in the Melchora Aquino Drawing contest in the year 1967. He finished his college education at the University of Santo Tomas College of Architecture and Fine Arts in Manila, with a degree in Painting. He earned a master's degree at University of the Philippines, Diliman.

Career

In 1980-1981, Bong worked as an Instructor at the Technology University of the Philippines. The following year, he worked as a visualizer in Abqaiq, Saudi Arabia. Until 1987, he was a self-employed sculptor of the Holy Images/Statues. In 1987-1989, He was a Finishing Department Head in FILMUNDO Export Corporation, that makes Filipino handicrafts, houseware, gifts/novelty items and Christmas and holiday decor. In 1989-1990, He was a supervisor at LAHI Crafts, Inc. In 1990-1992, He was an Instructor at the Philippine Women's University. He now works as a professor at the University of Santo Tomas College of Fine Arts and Design.

Recognition

University of Santo Tomas Benavides Civic Award
1975-1976 Most Outstanding Student (high school)
1976 Best Commercial Artist (high school)
1967 Third Honor (elementary school)
1967 Certificate of Merit

Competitions/Prizes

Elementary
1st Prize - (1967) Melchora Aquino Drawing Contest
1st Prize - (1970) On-the-spot Drawing Contest
3rd Prize - (1968) Drawing contest
3rd Prize - (1968) Poster-Making Contest

High school

1st Prize - (1973) Agro-Industrial Fair
1st Prize - (1973) JP Laurel High School Painting Contest
1st Prize - (1976) JP Laurel Day Painting Contest
1st Prize - (1976) JP Laurel Drawing Contest
2nd Prize - (1974) YMCA Hi-Y Poster Making Contest
3rd Prize - (1975) JP Laurel Day Watercolor Contest
3rd Honorable Mention - (1975) San Jose Trozo Parish, Manila Painting Contest

College

Art Association of the Philippines Best Entry (Gold Medal) - (November 1980) Devt. Painting Contest
1st Prize - (1980) UP Venerable Knight On-the-Spot Painting Contest
1st Prize - (1979) Philtrade Exhibit National On-the-spot Painting Contest 
2nd Prize - (1980) University of Santo Tomas Annual Exhibits Composition Painting Contest
3rd Prize - (1979) University of the East Annual Foundation Day On-the-spot Painting Competition
3rd Prize - (1976) UST Annual Exhibit's Freehand Drawing 
1st Honorable Mention - (1979) National On-the-spot Painting Contest at Sto Nino, Malolos Bulacan

Solo Exhibit
1994 - "The Joyful Moods of Nature" at the Gallery 3, Midtown Hotel

Group Exhibit
(1980) - Philippine Convention Center
(1980) - UST Main Building, "Jerusalem"
(1980) - UST Annual Students' Exhibit
(1979) - Philtrade Exhibit
(1978) - Hiyas ng Bulacan
(1977) - Hiyas ng Bulacan
(1979) - UP Balagtas at Selya
(1977) - YMCA Annual Exhibit
(1990) - Balon ng Sining, Intramuros
(1990) - Etnik Group Show
(1990) - Kamasipi
(1991) - SCUD sa Fine Arts- PWU
(1991) - Steel and Canvas, Toyota Shaw Showroom
(1991) - Artists Reflections, City Gallery
(1992) - Manila Artists Group, Manuela

References

External links 

Impressionist painters
1957 births
Filipino painters
Living people
People from Tondo, Manila
Artists from Metro Manila
University of Santo Tomas alumni
University of the Philippines Diliman alumni